Boris Dmitriyevich Kuznetsov (born 14 July 1928; died 3 December 1999) was a Russian and Soviet footballer. He was capped 26 times for Soviet Union, playing the 1958 FIFA World Cup. He also won the gold medal as part of the Soviet team at the 1956 Summer Olympics.

References

External links
Profile

1928 births
1999 deaths
Footballers from Moscow
Russian footballers
Soviet footballers
Soviet Union international footballers
FC Dynamo Moscow players
PFC CSKA Moscow players
Soviet Top League players
Olympic footballers of the Soviet Union
Footballers at the 1956 Summer Olympics
Olympic gold medalists for the Soviet Union
1958 FIFA World Cup players
Olympic medalists in football
Medalists at the 1956 Summer Olympics
Association football defenders